Trox hispidus is a beetle of the family Trogidae.

Subspecies
 Trox hispidus hispidus (Pontoppidan, 1763)
 Trox hispidus mixtus Harold, 1872

Description
The dorsal surface is convex and very rough, with ridges and tubercles, dark brown in color. On the body and legs this species has pale yellowish-white bristles.

Distribution
This species is present in most of Europe. These very rare beetles can be found in nests of birds of prey.

References 

 Pittino, R. 1991. On some Palaearctic "taxa" allied to Trox hispidus (Pontoppidan), with a brachypterous new species from Italy, Malta, Crete and the Balkan Peninsula (Coleoptera Trogidae) (XXXIV contribution to the knowledge of Coleoptera Scarabaeoidea). Boll. Ass. romana Ent.  Roma  45 (1-4): 57-87

hispidus
Beetles described in 1763